The 1st Washington D.C. Area Film Critics Association Awards, honoring the best in filmmaking in 2002, were given on December 30, 2002.

Winners
Best Film
 Road to Perdition
 Runners-up: Adaptation., About Schmidt, Antwone Fisher, The Lord of the Rings: The Two Towers

Best Director (TIE)
 Spike Jonze – Adaptation.
 Sam Mendes – Road to Perdition
 Denzel Washington – Antwone Fisher
 Runners-up: Peter Jackson – The Lord of the Rings: The Two Towers and Rob Marshall – Chicago

Best Actor
 Jack Nicholson – About Schmidt
 Runner-up: Daniel Day-Lewis – Gangs of New York

Best Actress
 Julianne Moore – Far from Heaven
 Runner-up: Maggie Gyllenhaal – Secretary

Best Supporting Actor (TIE)
 Chris Cooper – Adaptation.
 Dennis Haysbert – Far from Heaven
 Runner-up: Paul Newman – Road to Perdition

Best Supporting Actress
 Kathy Bates – About Schmidt
 Runners-up: Michelle Pfeiffer – White Oleander and Renée Zellweger – White Oleander

Best Ensemble
 Barbershop
 Runner-up: My Big Fat Greek Wedding

Best Original Screenplay
 Nia Vardalos – My Big Fat Greek Wedding
 Runners-up: Alfonso Cuarón and Carlos Cuarón – Y Tu Mamá También, Brad Silberling – Moonlight Mile, and Chap Taylor and Michael Tolkin – Changing Lanes

Best Adapted Screenplay
 Charlie Kaufman – Adaptation.
 Runner-up: Peter Hedges, Chris Weitz, and Paul Weitz – About a Boy

Best Animated Film
 Lilo & Stitch
 Runner-up: Ice Age

Best Documentary Film
 The Kid Stays in the Picture
 Runner-up: Standing in the Shadows of Motown

Biggest Disappointment
 Solaris

Best Guilty Pleasure
 Undercover Brother
 Runners-up: Blue Crush and Die Another Day

References

External links
 2002 WAFCA Awards

2002
2002 film awards